Al Freeman (born in 1981 in Canada) is a New York–based artist.

Solo exhibitions 
Freeman is currently represented by Carl Kostyál and 56 HENRY, which featured her in Cubicle in fall 2019. She also presented Pillows at Felix, Los Angeles, earlier that year, a reprisal of the exhibition first shown in 2017 at 56 HENRY. Other solo shows include: PAINTING, Carl Kostyál, London (2021) Mossgrön, Carl Kostyál, Canadian Embassy Tegelbacken 4, Stockholm(2020) Even More Comparisons, NADA Miami (2018), and More Comparisons, Bortolami Gallery, New York (2018). Freeman also had solo exhibition at Auroras, Sao Paolo and Empajada, Puerto Rico.

Group exhibitions 
Freeman participated in the group show Museum of Modern Art and Western Antiquities, Section II Department of Carving and Modeling: Form and Volume, at Cristina Guerra Contemporary Art, Lisbon (2019).  Other group exhibitions include: Flat, two person exhibition with Daniel Boccato, Carl Kostyál, London (2018) Coccaro on Paper, Carl Kostyál, Puglia, Italy (2018)

References

Living people
1981 births
21st-century Canadian artists
Canadian textile artists
Canadian women artists